The Wadajir Party (abbr. XW or WP Arabic: حزب ودجر) is a progressive democratic political party in Somalia founded by a group of Somali politicians, intellectuals and social activists from different parts of the country, with a wide range of experience.

Abdirahman Abdishakur Warsame became Wadajir Party presidential candidate in the 2017 Somali presidential election.

Foundation 
Wadajir Party was launched in June 2016 by a group of politicians. The party was founded six of months before the 2017 Somali presidential election to reform political fiefdoms, nepotism, deadlock, and corruption. The party's leader Abdirahman Abdishakur announced his candidacy for Somali president in June unveiling his manifesto, Iskutashi, a vision premised on the transformation of Somalia into a prosperous, self-reliant economy.

Isku-Tashi or self-reliance, is a framework that strives to promote nation building and unity through serious policy agendas putting Somalia on a path to economic development and self-sustainability. Isku-Tashi framework consists of the following five overarching themes that are critical to Somali success:

 Political Stability and National cohesion
 Restructuring security Sector
 Revitalizing Somali’s Economy Sector
 Public Services, Accountability, Combating Corruption
 Regional stability and International Cooperation

Attack on Wadajir Party headquarters 
On 17 December 2017, the Somali National Intelligence and Security Agency attacked Warsame and other members of the Wadajir Party, killing five security members guarding the party headquarters and injuring four others, including Warsame.

Later, Warsame would say that he did not retaliate as many expected, with some of his supporters even urging him to do so. He said that he instead chose the supremacy of the law and compromised for the sake of national interest.

Notable members of Wadajir Party 

 Abdirahman Abdishakur Warsame is a leader of Wadajir Party and former minister of planning and international relations of Somalia.
 Kamal Dahir Gutale is a former chief of staff of Villa Somalia.
Sayid Ali Moalim Abdulle is a former director of Port of Mogadishu.
Abdifitah Ibrahim Gesey is a former minister of public works, reconstruction and housing of the Federal Government of Somalia.
Abdiweli Aden Garyare is a veteran journalist.
Shador Haji Mohamoud is a former director of communications of Villa Somalia.
Saïd Muse Abdi is a political activist and businessman.
Abdilatif Muse Nur (Sanyare) is a former member of Somali Federal Parliament.

See also 

 Political parties in Somalia

References

2016 establishments in Somalia
Political parties established in 2016
Political parties in Somalia
Progressive parties
Social democratic parties in Somalia